Dayana is a given name. Notable people with the name include:

Given name 

 Dayana (pronunciation d̪ɪɑɴɑ, Language Hebrew, the Judge) variant of the given name Diana
 Dayana Cadeau (born 1966), Haitian-born Canadian American professional bodybuilder
 Dayana Cázares (born 1999), Mexican football midfielder
 Dayana Colmenares (born 1984), Miss Venezuela International 2007
 Dayana Garroz (born 1978), Venezuelan actress
 Dayana Kirillova (born 2002), Russian singer
 Dayana Martinez (born 1986), Venezuelan épée fencer
 Dayana Mendoza (born 1986), Venezuelan Miss Universe 2008 and contestant on Celebrity Apprentice
 Dayana Rodríguez (born 2001), Venezuelan footballer
 Dayana Yastremska (born 2000), Ukrainian professional tennis player

Nature 

 Laudakia dayana, species of Agamid lizard found in Haridwar, India
 Sophronitis dayana, species of orchid endemic to Brazil (southern Minas Gerais to Rio de Janeiro)

Hebrew feminine given names